The 1848 United States presidential election in Illinois took place on November 7, 1848, as part of the 1848 United States presidential election. Voters chose nine representatives, or electors to the Electoral College, who voted for President and Vice President.

Illinois narrowly voted for the Democratic candidate, Lewis Cass, over Whig candidate Zachary Taylor and Free Soil candidate Martin Van Buren. Cass won Illinois by a tight margin of 2.49%. This was the last time until 2000 that Illinois would back a losing Democrat in a presidential election.

Results

See also
 United States presidential elections in Illinois

References

Illinois
1848
1848 Illinois elections